Möbius is a 2013 French film written and directed by Éric Rochant, and starring Jean Dujardin and Cécile de France.

Plot
Russian spy, FSB Agent Gregory Lyubov is sent to Monaco to watch the actions of the powerful Russian oligarch named Ivan Rostovskiy. As part of this mission the team recruits a talented finance expert named Alice. Suspecting her of treason, Gregory breaks the golden rule and makes contact with Alice. Between them begins a passion that might destroy them.

Cast
 Jean Dujardin – Moïse/Gregory Lyubov
 Cécile de France – Alice Radmond
 Tim Roth – Ivan Rostovsky
 Émilie Dequenne – Sandra
 John Lynch – Joshua
 Dean Constantin – Joshua's main agent
 Vladimir Menshov – Cherkachin
 Branka Katić – Ava
 Wendell Pierce – Bob
 Oleksiy Gorbunov – Khorzov, Rostovsky's Head of Security
 Vicky Krieps - Olga
 Dmitry Nazarov - Inzirillo
 Michael J. Shannon - The father of Alice

Production
In November 2011, Jean Dujardin and Cecile de France were cast join the film production.

During Cannes Festival in May 2012, Tim Roth confessed he would play the role of a Russian oligarch suspect in crime. Director Eric Rochant found a physical resemblance between the actor and Roman Abramovich, Russian oligarch ranked in ninth place of the largest fortunes of his country and owner of the London-based football club Chelsea F.C.

According to Le Figaro, filming began in May 2012, and lasted eight to nine weeks in the south of France, Luxembourg, Brussels, Belgium and Moscow, Russia; and post-production started in October 2012.

Critical reception
The film received mixed reviews from the press and public.

See also
 Möbius strip

References

External links

2013 films
2010s spy thriller films
Films about the Federal Security Service
Films directed by Éric Rochant
French spy thriller films
Films shot in Monaco
Films set in Monaco
Films set in Moscow
2010s French films